"Thug Lovin" is a song by American rapper Ja Rule featuring singer Bobby Brown, released on November 4, 2002 as the first single from Ja Rule's fourth studio album, The Last Temptation (2002). The song was produced by Irv Gotti. Bobby Brown's sung portion is an interpolation of part of the chorus of the Stevie Wonder song "Knocks Me Off My Feet".

The music video, directed by Irv Gotti, for the song features scenes of Ja Rule and Bobby Brown in a helicopter, on a helipad on top of a skyscraper which has the Murder Inc. logo on it, the two artists driving in a Bentley, and the two going to a party. The video premiered on BET's Access Granted in 2002.

Charts

Weekly charts

Year-end charts

Certifications

Release history

References

2002 singles
2002 songs
Ja Rule songs
Def Jam Recordings singles
Male vocal duets
Songs written by Irv Gotti
Songs written by Ja Rule
Songs written by Stevie Wonder